The following is a list of notable people associated with Seoul National University, located in Gwanak, Seoul, South Korea.

Notable alumni and faculty

Academia
 Chang Ha-joon (B.A. Economics), economist; former Consultant to the World Bank
 Cho Kah-kyung (B.A.), Korean-American philosopher
 Choi Soon-ja (M.A. French language and literature), linguist
 Choi Yang-do (B.S. Agricultural Chemistry), agricultural biotechnologist; professor at Seoul National University (College of Agriculture)
 Huh June-e (B.S. physics and M.Sc. Mathematics), Fields Medalist
 Kim Joo-myeong (B.S., M.S. Microbiology), Korean-American biological scientist
 Kim Sung-hou (B.S. & M.S. Chemistry), Korean-American structural biologist and biophysicist; member of the National Academy of Sciences
 Kim Vic-narry (B.A., M.Sc. Microbiology), biochemist and microbiologist; professor at Seoul National University and Director of the Center for RNA Research, Institute for Basic Science
 Kang-tae Kim (M.Sc. Mathematics), mathematician; professor at Pohang University of Science and Technology
 Kim Won-yong (B.A.), known for pioneer in South Korean archaeology; former professor at Seoul National University College of Humanities, awarded Distinguished SNU Members in 1993
 Lee Ki-baek (B.A.), historian
 Lee Kyoung-jun (M.A. Public Administration, Ph.D.), management professor; professor at Kyung Hee University (College of Management)
 Park Jong-sei (B.S. Chemistry), chemistry researcher and government official; former head of the Korea Institute of Science and Technology's Applied Sciences Division and Chairman of the Food and Drug Administration from 1998–1999
 Son Bong-ho (B.A.), Christian ethics scholar and social activist; former president of Hansung University and of Dongduk Women's University
 Yang Won-sik (Ph.D.), orthodontist; former Director of the Department of Orthodontics, Dental Hospital, Seoul National University

Entertainment
 Bang Si-hyuk (B.A. Aesthetics), songwriter, producer and business executive; founder of HYBE Corporation
 Lim Sung-bin (stage name Beenzino), (B.F.A. Sculpture), rapper and music producer
 Chang Kiha (B.A. Sociology), singer-songwriter
 Chyung Eun-ju (B.A. double major in Business Administration and Spanish), Miss World Korea, model and broadcaster
 Hwang Dong-hyuk (B.A. Communications), film director and screenwriter; creator of the 2021 Netflix series Squid Game. Emmy Awards winner.
 Jang Sun-woo (B.A. Anthropology), film director
 Jo Sung-hee (B.A. Industrial Design), film director
 Jo Yun-suk (stage name Lucid Fall), (B.S. Chemical Engineering), singer-songwriter and former nanotechnology researcher
 Jung Jin-young (B.A. Korean Language and Literature), actor
 Jung Ki-yeol (stage name Kai), (B.F.A. Voice), singer and musical theatre actor
 Kam Woo-sung (B.A. Oriental Painting), actor
 Kim Chang-wan (B.S. Agricultural Studies), actor and rock singer
 Kim Eui-sung (B.B.A.), actor
 Kim Hye-eun (B.M. Voice), actress
Kim Jeong-hoon, actor and singer
 Kim Ki-young (Bachelor of Stomatology), film director
 Kim Myung-gon (B.A. German Language Education), actor, screenwriter and music director
 Kim So-hyun (B.M. Voice), musical theatre actress
 Kim Sung-min (B.S. Physical and Social Education), actor
 Kim Tae-hee (B.A. Fashion Design), actress 
Lee Byung-hoon (B.S. Forestry), television director and producer
 Lee Juck (B.A. Sociology), singer-songwriter
 Lee Hanee / Honey Lee (B.M. Korean Music & M.M.), actress, model, classical musician and Miss Universe 2007 3rd runner-up
 Lee Sang-yoon (B.S. Physics), actor
 Lee Soo-man (B.Eng.), business executive and music producer; founder of SM Entertainment
 Lee Soon-jae (B.Phil.), actor
 Min Kyu-dong (B.A. Economics), film director, screenwriter and producer
 Seo Jung-hack (B.M. Voice), singer
 Shin Young-kyun (Bachelor of Stomatology), actor, film producer and politician
 Kim Jin-tae (stage name Verbal Jint), (B.A. Economics), rapper, lyricist and record producer
 You Hee-yeol (B.M. Composition), singer-songwriter and TV host

Literature, arts and culture
 Chin Un-suk (B.M. Composition), composer, Arnold Schönberg Prize 2005 
 Gum Nanse (B.M. Composition), conductor
 Han Terra (B.A., M.A. and Ph.D.), inventor, composer, gayageum virtuoso and polymath
 Hyun Ki-young (B.A.), author; former President of the Korean Arts & Culture Foundation
 Hwang Byung-ki (LL.B.), gayageum player and composer
 Jo Su-mi, soprano; Grammy Award winner
 Kim Chi-ha (B.A. Aesthetics), poet and playwright
 Kim Ji-hoon (B.M.), opera singer; principal of The Royal Opera
 Kim Seong-tae (B.M. Composition) composer; professor at Seoul National University (College of Music)
 Kim Seungok (B.A. French Literature), novelist and screenwriter
 Kim Swoo-geun (B.Arch.), architect, educator and publisher
 Kim Tschoon-su (B.F.A.), painter; professor at Seoul National University (College of Fine Arts)
 Kim Yong-jun (art critic), painter and critic, faculty member 1946-48
 Lee O-young (B.A., M.A. Korean Literature), critic and novelist; professor emeritus of Ewha Womans University and former professor at Dankook University
 Lee Yangji (B.A.), Zainichi-Korean novelist; winner of the 1988 Akutagawa Prize
 Oh Jung-geun (B.F.A.), painter
 Park Young-hi (B.M.), composer; professor at the University of the Arts Bremen
 Park Wan-suh, writer
 Pi Chun-deuk, famous South Korean essay author, awarded Distinguished SNU Members in 1999
 Do Ho Suh (B.F.A and M.F.A. Oriental Painting), sculptor and installation artist
 Suh Yong-sun (B.F.A.), painter and sculptor; former professor at Seoul National University (College of Fine Arts)
 Yi In-seong (B.A., M.A. French Literature), modern novelist

Medicine
 Chang Kee-ryo (M.D.), famous doctor as philanthropist in South Korea, awarded Distinguished SNU Members in 1992.
 Suh Yoo-hun (M.D., Ph.D. in medicine and pharmacology), neuroscientist; professor at Seoul National University (College of Medicine)
 Yoon Bo-hyun (M.D., Ph.D.), physician and researcher in obstetrics and gynecology; professor at Seoul National University (College of Medicine)

Public service
 Ahn Cheol-soo (M.D., M.S. and Ph.D. Physiology), doctor of medicine, physician, programmer, entrepreneur, professor, politician ; founder of AhnLab Inc. and former Dean of the Graduate School of Convergence Science and Technology (Seoul National University)
 Ban Ki-moon (B.A. International Relations), politician and diplomat; the 8th UN Secretary-General
 Cho Kuk (LL.B., LL.M.), former Senior Secretary to the President for Civil Affairs (2017-2019), former South Korea Minister of Justice
 Kang Hyun-wook (B.A. Foreign Studies), politician; former Governor of North Jeolla Province, Minister of Agriculture, Forestry and Fisheries (1992–1993), and Minister of the Environment (1996–1997)
 Lee Hyun-jae (B.A.), politician; Chairman of the Ho-Am Prize Committee and South Korea's 18th Prime Minister
 Lee Tai-young (LL.B), first female lawyer in South Korea, awarded Distinguished SNU Members in 1991
 Kim Sang-gon (B.A., M.A. and Ph.D Business Administration), former Minister of Education and Deputy Prime Minister of South Korea
 Kim Wan-ju (B.A. Political Science & M.A. Public Administration), politician; the 32nd Governor of North Jeolla Province and former mayor of Jeonju City
 Kim Young-sam (B.A. Philosophy), politician and activist; the 14th President of the Republic of Korea
 Yoon Suk-yeol (LL.B., LL.M.), Prosecutor General of South Korea;  13th President of South Korea
 Yu Myung-hwan (B.A. Public Administration), diplomat; former Minister of Foreign Affairs and Trade

Social movement
 Lee Hee-ho (B.A. Education) renowned feminism activist in South Korea, awarded Distinguished SNU Members in 2000

References

People
 
 
Seoul National